Osmocene is an organoosmium compound found as a white solid. It is a metallocene with the formula Os(C5H5)2.

Synthesis 
Osmocene is commercially available. It may be prepared by the reaction of osmium tetroxide with hydrobromic acid followed by zinc and cyclopentadiene.

It was first synthesized by Ernst Otto Fischer and Heinrich Grumbert via the reaction of osmium(IV) chloride with excess sodium cyclopentadienide in dimethoxyethane, where osmium(II) chloride is presumed to be an intermediate formed in situ. Alternatively, cyclopentadienyl magnesium bromide could be reacted with osmium(IV) chloride, though this has worse yields.

Properties 
Osmocene is a white solid. The molecular structure features an osmium ion sandwiched between two cyclopentadienyl rings. It is isomorphous to the lighter homologue ruthenocene, both crystallizing in an eclipsed conformation. This is in contrast to ferrocene, which crystallizes with its rings staggered. 

Compared to ferrocene and ruthenocene, osmocene is less reactive towards electrophilic aromatic substitution but has the greatest tendency towards adduct formation with Lewis acids.

The osmocenium cation [Os(C5H5)2]+ dimerizes, forming a binuclear complex with an Os-Os bond. In contrast, the decamethylosmocenium cation [Os(C5(CH3)5)2]+ is stable as the monomer.

Uses
In 2009, Horst Kunkely and Arnd Vogler reported the possibility of photocatalytic water splitting with osmocene as a catalyst.

References

Metallocenes
Organoosmium compounds